Simon Renucci (born March 29, 1945) was a member of the National Assembly of France.  He represented the Corse-du-Sud department from 2002 to 2012 as a member of the Socialiste, radical, citoyen et divers gauche.

References

1945 births
Living people
People from Corse-du-Sud
Corsican politicians
Members of the Corsican Assembly
Mayors of Ajaccio
Deputies of the 12th National Assembly of the French Fifth Republic
Deputies of the 13th National Assembly of the French Fifth Republic